George William Russell (born 15 February 1998) is a British racing driver currently competing in Formula One for Mercedes. He previously raced for Williams from 2019 to 2021, leading the team to finish eighth in the 2021 Constructors' Championship after finishing last in 2019 and 2020 respectively by scoring a podium at the wet-weather affected 2021 Belgian Grand Prix.

After winning several karting championships including the CIK-FIA European Karting Championship in 2012, he repeated his success by becoming the  Formula 2 champion and the 2017 GP3 Series champion, driving for ART in both campaigns to become one of only three drivers to win both championships in his respective rookie seasons. In 2022, Russell departed Williams to race for the Mercedes team, having been a member of the Mercedes Junior Driver Programme since 2017. Russell achieved his first F1 victory at the 2022 São Paulo Grand Prix.

Russell agreed to drive for Mercedes on a multi-year deal, without giving any detailed information about the contract length.

Personal life
Russell was born in King's Lynn, Norfolk, to father Steve and mother Alison, the youngest alongside two siblings: a sister, Cara, and an older brother, Benjy. Russell took up karting at the age of 7, having spent much of his time around karting tracks and his brother Benjy, who was also involved in competitive karting. Russell attributes his brother as the reason for using the number 63 as his permanent race number in Formula One. Growing up in Wisbech, Cambridgeshire, Russell was educated at the Wisbech Grammar School, before moving to Milton Keynes at the age of 18 to be closer to his racing teams.

Like his father, he is a fan of Wolverhampton Wanderers Football Club.

Junior racing career

Karting
Russell began karting in 2006 and progressed through to the cadet class by 2009, becoming MSA British champion and British Open champion. In 2010 he moved to the Rotax Mini Max category where he became Super One British champion, Formula Kart Stars British champion, and also won the Kartmasters British Grand Prix. Russell graduated to the KF3 class in 2011, winning the SKUSA Supernationals title and becoming CIK-FIA European Championship, a title he successfully defended in 2012. In his final year of karting in 2013, Russell finished 19th in the KF1 CIK-FIA World Championship.

Formula Renault 2.0
In 2014, Russell made his single-seater debut, racing in the Formula Renault 2.0 Alps championship. He originally signed to race for Prema Powerteam, before making a last-minute switch to Koiranen GP. Despite missing a round through illness, he finished fourth in the championship, taking a single podium finish at the Red Bull Ring.

Russell also contested two rounds of the Eurocup Formula Renault 2.0 championship. He took part in the Moscow round with Koiranen GP before switching to Tech 1 Racing for the final round of the season at Jerez. Racing as a guest entrant, he won the final race of the season after starting from pole position.

Formula 4
In 2014, Russell also competed in the BRDC Formula 4 Championship with defending champions Lanan Racing. He entered the final race of the season at Snetterton in a four-way title battle with teammate Arjun Maini and the HHC Motorsport pairing of Sennan Fielding and Raoul Hyman. After starting from pole position, Russell won the race, his fifth of the season, to clinch the title by just three points from Maini.

As a prize for winning the BRDC Formula 4 championship, Russell tested a GP3 car with Arden Motorsport at the Yas Marina Circuit in Abu Dhabi. In December 2014, Russell became the youngest-ever winner of the prestigious McLaren Autosport BRDC Award, beating fellow finalists Alexander Albon, Ben Barnicoat, Sennan Fielding, Seb Morris and Harrison Scott to earn himself a £100,000 cash prize, British Racing Drivers' Club membership and a Formula One test with McLaren.

In February 2015, Russell was announced as one of the twelve drivers selected to join the British Racing Drivers' Club SuperStars programme, the youngest-ever recruit to the scheme.

FIA Formula 3 European Championship

Russell graduated to Formula Three in 2015, racing in the FIA European Formula 3 Championship with Carlin. He took his first race victory in the opening round of the season at Silverstone, finishing ahead of fellow debutant Charles Leclerc and Antonio Giovinazzi in the second race of the weekend. He took a further two podium places at Spa-Francorchamps and the Norisring to finish sixth in the championship. He also finished as runner-up to Leclerc in the rookie championship standings.

In September 2015, Russell took part in the Masters of Formula 3 non-championship event held at Zandvoort. After finishing fourth in the qualification race, he went on to finish second behind teammate Antonio Giovinazzi in the main race. Russell was also scheduled to compete in the Macau Grand Prix with Carlin, but was replaced by Japanese Euroformula Open Championship driver Yu Kanamaru shortly before the event.

Russell switched to Hitech GP for the 2016 season, scored two victories, and finished third in the standings.

GP3 Series
Russell signed with ART Grand Prix for the 2017 GP3 Series season. He had previously driven for the team at the post-season test at Yas Marina in November 2016.

Russell made a solid start to the season at the Circuit de Catalunya, Barcelona, where he finished the weekend with 4th and 5th position finishes. The next race at the Red Bull Ring saw him take his maiden pole position and victory in the GP3 Series. Russell scored back to back pole positions at his 'home race' at Silverstone, before converting this into another victory in the first race of the weekend and taking 4th position in the second race, on his way to taking the championship lead.

A dominant performance at Spa-Francorchamps soon followed which saw Russell build his championship lead advantage, after taking a victory and a 2nd position in the two races, alongside Pole Position and Fastest Lap in both races.

The next round at Monza saw only one GP3 Series event take place after adverse weather conditions resulting into the Saturday Race being cancelled. Russell won a titanic tussle with his ART Grand Prix teammates Jack Aitken and Anthoine Hubert to seal his fourth victory of the season.

Russell had taken four victories, three pole positions, and five further podiums to put him in a position to seal the championship at Jerez, with a complete round of the championship still to run at Yas Marina. Russell won the 2017 GP3 Series title after taking 4th position in race two, giving him an unassailable lead in the championship standings.

FIA Formula 2 Championship 

In January 2018 Russell was confirmed as a driver for ART Grand Prix for the 2018 FIA Formula 2 Championship, which would see the new Dallara F2 2018 make its debut in the expanding 12-race calendar. He was also confirmed as the Mercedes' reserve driver, sharing duties with Pascal Wehrlein the following month.

Russell qualified in 2nd position on debut at Bahrain, finishing 5th in the opening round of the championship. In Baku for the second round of the championship, Russell led the majority of the feature race before a late safety car caused drama at the restart, denying him a maiden victory in the series. Coming through from the back in the sprint race, Russell set the fastest lap on his way to taking victory from 12th on the grid.

Russell took his second victory of the season in Barcelona, after prevailing in a duel with Nyck de Vries, taking his maiden feature race win of the season. He followed that up with 4th in the sprint race to move up to 2nd in the championship standings. In Monte-Carlo, Russell had an engine failure in free practice which severely limited his running. Russell was on the back foot, qualifying in 16th position, and endured two races outside of the points. Russell hit back in France at Le Castellet, taking his maiden pole position in Formula 2. He led a wet / dry challenging race from lights-to-flag and took his third victory of the season and the championship.

He would later go on to win the title with a victory in the feature race at Abu Dhabi after a season-long fight with fellow Brit Lando Norris. With his title, he became the fifth rookie champion of the GP2/F2 category (previously achieved by Nico Rosberg, Lewis Hamilton, Nico Hülkenberg, and Charles Leclerc), and the fourth driver after Hamilton, Hülkenberg and Leclerc to win the GP3/F3 and GP2/F2 titles in consecutive seasons.

Formula One
Russell's first experience of driving a Formula One car came in October 2015; as a prize for winning the 2014 Autosport BRDC Award, he completed a test in the McLaren MP4-26 at Silverstone Circuit. During 2016 he performed simulator work for Mercedes and was made part of the team's junior driver programme in early 2017. His first test with the team came in April that year where he drove the F1 W06 Hybrid at Algarve International Circuit. This was followed in August by an appearance at the Hungaroring in-season test at the wheel of the F1 W08 EQ Power+. Russell made his Grand Prix weekend debut in November, driving for Force India in the first practice sessions of the Brazilian and Abu Dhabi Grands Prix.

Williams (2019–2021)

2019: Rookie season 

In October 2018 it was announced that Russell had signed a multi-year deal to drive for Williams, partnering Robert Kubica for the 2019 season. His first appearance for Williams was at the 2018 post-season test at Yas Marina Circuit, driving the FW41. The team's 2019 car, the FW42, was the slowest car of the field; in most races Kubica was Russell's only on-track competition. At the rain-affected , Russell finished 13th but was promoted to 11th after the Alfa Romeo drivers received penalties. He had narrowly missed out on scoring his maiden Formula One point, having been overtaken by Kubica in the closing laps.

Russell's first retirement came at the  when Romain Grosjean made contact with him during an overtake attempt, sending Russell into a wall. The  provided one of the few opportunities of Russell's debut season to race other cars, where a late safety car allowed him to finish 12th, just 1.5 seconds behind a points-scoring position. Russell ended the season 20th in the drivers' championship. He was the only driver not to score a point, however he qualified ahead of Kubica at all twenty-one races. Russell retained his relationship with Mercedes during the season and drove the team's F1 W10 EQ Power+ in two test sessions.

2020: First F1 career points  

He retired from the season-opening  from a loss of fuel pressure. He ran wide into the gravel in the early laps and ultimately finished 16th, both Williams drivers struggling for race pace.

He was eliminated from the  after a stray wheel from Antonio Giovinazzi's crashed car hit his Williams. He was in ninth place before the second red flag period but experienced a poor restart and eventually finished 11th, less than three seconds behind 10th place.

Mercedes stand-in
Russell stated in the pre-event press conference that he felt "no pressure", following Mercedes team principal Toto Wolff's expectation that the car would finish in the top five. Russell qualified second for the race, narrowly missing out on pole position to teammate Valtteri Bottas by 26 milliseconds. Russell overtook Bottas at the first corner and led most of the race, but with 20 laps remaining, Mercedes team mechanics fitted Bottas' front tyres on Russell's car, causing him to pit again on the next lap to correct the error. He recovered to second place and was closing in on race leader Sergio Pérez, but suffered a slow puncture ten laps before the finish and was forced to pit again. Russell finished ninth and earnt his first World Championship points, two points for ninth and one for the fastest lap. Russell was praised by the media and the Mercedes team for his performance, but he remarked that the result "really bloody hurt".

Return to Williams
Following Friday practice, Russell said that returning to Williams was a "strange feeling", having competed in the faster Mercedes the week before. For the event, he wore a special helmet as a tribute to Williams co-founder Frank Williams and former deputy team principal Claire Williams, both of whom had left the team and Formula One earlier in the season. Russell qualified 18th and finished the race 15th. He ended the season 18th in the championship with 3 points, all from his one race with Mercedes; the Williams team scored no points in 2020.

2021: Maiden F1 podium
Russell was retained by Williams for the 2021 season alongside Nicholas Latifi. Russell initially blamed the incident on Bottas, accusing him of "trying to kill [them] both", but later retracted his claims and apologised to Bottas and his own Williams team.

He was promoted to 10th place after Yuki Tsunoda received a grid penalty, his best grid position for Williams. During the race, Russell gained two positions in the opening laps but later entered the pits multiple times as his team attempted to resolve a reliability issue. He eventually retired from the race. He finished the race 11th, having been passed by Fernando Alonso in the closing laps. He finished the race 12th.

In the rain-affected  qualifying session, Russell qualified in second place behind Max Verstappen. This marked the first front-row start for Williams since the 2017 Italian Grand Prix. The race was delayed by wet weather and ultimately only two laps were completed, both under safety car conditions. This allowed Russell to maintain his grid position and claim his first Formula One podium finish. At the Russian Grand Prix, Russell qualified in third in mixed conditions, before finishing the race in tenth. This would be his final points finish of the year. He placed 15th in the drivers' championship, scoring 16 points to teammate Latifi's 7. He also continued his testing role with Mercedes during 2021, completing a Pirelli tyre test in the team's F1 W12 E Performance at the Hungaroring in August.

Mercedes (2022–)

2022: Maiden pole position and win
He chose to change his red helmet design to a predominantly black design out of respect for Michael Schumacher. He failed to reach Q3 at both the Emilia Romagna and Miami Grands Prix but recovered to finish the races fourth and fifth respectively.

Russell was involved in a first-lap crash at the British Grand Prix involving several drivers. He jumped out of his car to check on Zhou Guanyu, whose car had flipped over the tyre barrier and was resting upside-down against the catch fence. Russell's intention was to rejoin the race, however this was forbidden as his car had been brought back to the pits by the marshals and not under its own power. He recovered to finish fourth. At the Hungarian Grand Prix, Russell took his maiden pole position in Formula One, 0.044 seconds ahead of Ferrari's Carlos Sainz Jr. He led much of the race but was later overtaken by Max Verstappen and teammate Hamilton, finishing third. Further podiums came at the Dutch and Italian Grands Prix, putting him 16 points adrift of second place in the drivers' championship.

He made a pit stop for slick tyres before the track was dry, losing time and eventually finishing outside the points. He later apologised to Sainz and described the race as his "worst Sunday" of the year despite finishing fifth. He qualified in third position for the São Paulo Grand Prix and passed Verstappen and Kevin Magnussen to win the sprint. He held the lead during the race to finish ahead of Hamilton and claim his first Grand Prix victory and Mercedes' first of the season. Russell ended the season fourth in the drivers' championship, scoring 275 points to Hamilton's 240.

Other activities 
In March 2021, Russell was appointed as a director of the Grand Prix Drivers' Association, replacing previous incumbent Romain Grosjean, who stepped down following his departure from Formula One to IndyCar.

In March 2022, Russell agreed for his name to be used in the inaugural GB4 Championship, with the George Russell Pole Position Cup being awarded to the driver taking the most pole positions during the season. Russell had previously won the Jack Cavill Pole Position Cup during his title-winning campaign in BRDC Formula 4 in 2014.

Karting record

Karting career summary

Racing record

Racing career summary 

† As Russell was a guest driver, he was ineligible for championship points.
 Season still in progress.

Complete BRDC Formula 4 Championship results
(key) (Races in bold indicate pole position) (Races in italics indicate points for the fastest lap of top ten finishers)

Complete Formula Renault 2.0 Alps Series results
(key) (Races in bold indicate pole position) (Races in italics indicate fastest lap)

Complete FIA Formula 3 European Championship results
(key) (Races in bold indicate pole position) (Races in italics indicate fastest lap)

Complete Macau Grand Prix results

Complete GP3 Series results
(key) (Races in bold indicate pole position) (Races in italics indicate fastest lap)

Complete FIA Formula 2 Championship results
(key) (Races in bold indicate pole position) (Races in italics indicate points for the fastest lap of top ten finishers)

Complete Formula One results
(key) (Races in bold indicate pole position; races in italics indicate fastest lap)

 Half points awarded as less than 75% of race distance was completed.
 Did not finish but was classified, as he completed more than 90% of the race distance.
 Season still in progress.

References

External links

 
 
 British Racing Drivers' Club profile

1998 births
Living people
English Formula One drivers
English racing drivers
Formula Renault Eurocup drivers
FIA Formula 2 Championship drivers
FIA Formula 3 European Championship drivers
Formula Renault 2.0 Alps drivers
GP3 Series Champions
GP3 Series drivers
Karting World Championship drivers
People educated at Wisbech Grammar School
Sportspeople from King's Lynn
Williams Formula One drivers
Twitch (service) streamers
Mercedes-Benz Formula One drivers
Koiranen GP drivers
Tech 1 Racing drivers
Carlin racing drivers
Hitech Grand Prix drivers
ART Grand Prix drivers
FIA Formula 2 Champions
Formula One race winners